The Dogfather is an American series of 17 cartoons produced by DePatie–Freleng Enterprises and released between 1974 and 1976. It is the final theatrical cartoon series made by DePatie–Freleng. This cartoon The Dogfather is the same most of next Misterjaw.

Plot 
The Dogfather was a parody of The Godfather, but with canines as part of the Italian organized crime syndicate. It consists of the Dogfather (voiced by Bob Holt impersonating Marlon Brando) and his henchmen Pug (also Bob Holt) and Louie (voiced by Daws Butler).

The opening credits featured the Dogfather, speaking to the lyrics of a song entitled "I'll make him an offer he can't Refuse".

The Dogfather was later broadcast as part of the NBC Saturday morning cartoon series The Pink Panther and Friends.

Filmography

Revival 
The Dogfather was revived (and re-designed) in 1993 as a recurring antagonist for The Pink Panther. The Dogfather was voiced by Joe Piscopo (except for "It's Just a Gypsy in My Soup" where he was voiced by Jim Cummings), while Pug and Louie are voiced by Brian George and Jess Harnell.

Remakes 
Much like a number of DFE-produced cartoon shorts, about half of the Dogfather cartoons were remakes of Looney Tunes cartoons from the 1950s that were directed by Freleng, which are listed below:
 The pilot episode (The Dogfather) was a remake of Tree For Two (1952).
 The Goose that Laid a Golden Egg was a remake of Golden Yeggs (1950).
 Heist and Seek was a remake of Bugsy and Mugsy (1957).
 Mother Dogfather was a remake of Stork Naked (1955).
 Saltwater Tuffy was a remake of Tugboat Granny (1956)
 Devilled Yeggs was a remake of Satan's Waitin' (1954).
 Watch the Birdie was a remake of Dr. Jerkyll's Hide (1954).
 M-O-N-E-Y Spells Love was a remake of Hare Trimmed (1953).
 Rock-a-Bye Maybe was a remake of Kit for Cat (1948).
 Eagle Beagles was a remake of Hare Lift (1952).
However, this was criticized by Charles Brubaker, the author of the website Cartoon Research, who pointed out that this made the series almost completely unoriginal and resulted in inferior versions of those Looney Tunes shorts.

Crew 
 Produced by: David H. DePatie and Friz Freleng
 Directors: Hawley Pratt, Gerry Chiniquy, Arthur Leonardi
 Story: Bob Ogle, Don Christiansen, John W. Dunn, Friz Freleng, Dave Detiege
 Title Designer: Arthur Leonardi
 Animation: John V. Gibbs, Bob Matz, Norm McCabe, Bob Richardson, Warren Batchelder, Don Williams, Bob Bransford, Nelson Shin
 Layout: Dick Ung, Richard H. Thomas, Roy Morita
 Background: Richard H. Thomas
 Music by: Dean Elliott
 Lyrics: John Bradford
 Camera: John Burton Jr.
 Executive in Charge: Lee Gunther

Home media
Kino Lorber released all 17 shorts on DVD and Blu-ray in April 2018.

References

External links 
 Big Cartoon Database
 Mofolândia 

Film series introduced in 1974
Animated film series
DePatie–Freleng Enterprises
Films scored by Dean Elliott
Television series by MGM Television
Anthropomorphic dogs
The Pink Panther Show